Kalef Alaton (1940–1989) was in interior designer. Alaton is known as one of the biggest influences on the Californian residential interiors in the 1980s.

Career 
Born on May 14, 1940 in Turkey, Alaton originally intended on becoming an artist and while studying art in Paris at age 16, he switched his focus to interior design. While studying design he worked under Russian designer Oscar Mourinsky. Alaton later moved to Los Angeles, California where he quickly became a designer. He was known  for giving new life to antique pieces by incorporating them into his otherwise modern designs. Alaton can best be linked to the Modernism design movement that lasted from the late 19th century to the early 20th century. Alaton has designed interiors such as a triplex in West Hollywood that were homes to Marilyn Monroe and Frank Sinatra, as well as homes in Beverly Hills such as Simon and Serlee Beriro's residence. His specialty was residential design, and focused on the needs of the client. His inspiration was the client and had them thoroughly involved in the design process. Alaton was also the mentor of interior designer Marjorie Shushan, who credits him as "the designer who changed my life. He taught me to be curious and always open to new ideas." She worked under him for 10 years before opening her own firm in New York City. Alaton was named one of the top 20 greatest designers of all time in 2010 by Architectural Digest and listed in the Interior Hall of Fame in 2014.

Death 
Alaton died on May 15, 1989 due to AIDS complications and is survived by his life partner Ralf Webb.

References 

1940 births
1989 deaths
Turkish interior designers
Turkish expatriates in France
Turkish emigrants to the United States